Mouilha, 	Aïn Mouilha or M'Liliha is a town and commune in Djelfa Province, Algeria. According to the 1998 census it has a population of 13,155. It lies on the N46 highway, northeast of Djelfa.

References

Communes of Djelfa Province